A by-election was held for the South Australian House of Assembly seat of Mitcham on 8 May 1982.

The by-election was triggered by the resignation of former state Democrats MHA Robin Millhouse. The Liberal Party was expected to win the seat, but Democrats candidate Heather Southcott was heavily favoured by Labor party preferences, and was a surprise winner. 

The Liberals won the seat six months later at the 1982 state election.

Results
The Australia Party, who contested the previous election and gained 0.3 percent, did not contest the by-election. The Democrats retained the seat by 45 votes.

See also
List of South Australian House of Assembly by-elections

References

South Australian state by-elections
1982 elections in Australia
1980s in South Australia